The 1978 NCAA Division I basketball tournament involved 32 schools playing in single-elimination play to determine the national champion of men's  NCAA Division I college basketball. It began on March 11, 1978, and ended with the championship game on March 27 in St. Louis, Missouri. A total of 32 games were played, including a national third-place game.

The process of seeding the bracket was first used in this tournament. Sixteen conference winners with automatic bids were seeded 1 through 4 in each region. At-large teams were seeded 1 through 4 in each region separately. There were in fact only eleven true at-large teams in the field, as the remaining five were conference winners with automatic bids and seeded  The practice of distinguishing between automatic and at-large teams ended with this edition; the expanded field of forty in the 1979 tournament was simply seeded from one to ten in each of the four regions.

Led by head coach Joe B. Hall, Kentucky won its fifth national title with a 94–88 victory over Duke, coached by Bill Foster. Wildcat forward Jack Givens scored 41 points in the finale and was named the tournament's most outstanding player.

The bracket's biggest upset came in the first round, when little-heralded Miami (Ohio) defeated defending champion Marquette 84-81 in overtime.  The victory was even sweeter for Miami Redskins (now RedHawks) fans as former Marquette coach Al McGuire had earlier strongly criticized the NCAA for potentially matching Marquette against Kentucky in the second round, with Marquette being given a first-round opponent in Miami that was supposedly not even worthy of providing an adequate tune-up game.

Unranked Cal State Fullerton (CSUF) pulled off two upsets, first over 4th ranked New Mexico (coached by Norm Ellenberger and led by Michael Cooper) and then over top-10 San Francisco (featuring Bill Cartwright). The loss was especially painful for New Mexico as the regional semifinals and finals were held on the Lobos' home court in Albuquerque. CSUF then almost upset Arkansas in the West Regional final, losing by 3 points. In each of the three games, the Titans overcame second-half double-digit deficits. In the Arkansas game, they cut a big deficit to 1 and had the ball with 14 seconds left. But Arkansas' Jim Counce stole the ball from Keith Anderson (many observers felt Anderson was fouled) and drove down to hit a clinching layup.

In the Mideast regional final, Kentucky knocked off Michigan State, led by freshman Earvin "Magic" Johnson. This was the only time in a 4-year period (that included his senior year in high school, 2 years of college, and his rookie NBA season) that Magic's team did not win its final game of the playoffs and hence the championship.

The Final Four games (semifinals, third-place, and championship) at St. Louis Arena (a.k.a. The Checkerdome) were not played on the arena's official floor.  Water damage to it forced the NCAA to borrow the floor from Indiana University's Assembly Hall in Bloomington.

This was the fourth and last year for a 32-team bracket; the field expanded to forty teams in 1979 and 48 in 1980, all seeded. The 64-team field debuted in 1985, eliminating byes for the top seeds (1979–1984). The third-place game at the Final Four was last played in 1981.

Schedule and venues

The following are the sites that were selected to host each round of the 1978 tournament:

First round
March 11
Mideast Region
 Market Square Arena, Indianapolis, Indiana
 Stokely Athletic Center, Knoxville, Tennessee
West Region
 McArthur Court, Eugene, Oregon
 ASU Activity Center, Tempe, Arizona
March 12
East Region
 Charlotte Coliseum, Charlotte, North Carolina
 The Palestra, Philadelphia, Pennsylvania
Midwest Region
 Mabee Center, Tulsa, Oklahoma
 Levitt Arena, Wichita, Kansas

Regional semifinals and finals (Sweet Sixteen and Elite Eight)
March 16 and 18
Mideast Regional, University of Dayton Arena, Dayton, Ohio
West Regional, University Arena ("The Pit"), Albuquerque, New Mexico
March 17 and 19
East Regional, Providence Civic Center, Providence, Rhode Island
Midwest Regional, Allen Fieldhouse, Lawrence, Kansas

National semifinals, 3rd-place game, and championship (Final Four and championship)
March 25 and 27
The Checkerdome, St. Louis, Missouri

For the second time in six years, St. Louis was chosen as the host city for the Final Four, the eighth city to host multiple times. There were no new host cities for the first time since 1950, but one new venue, Market Square Arena, marking the first time since 1940 that the tournament returned to Indianapolis, now a common site of Final Fours. The tournament did mark the last time it would be held at McArthur Court, as it has not returned to Eugene since. It was also the last time the regionals would be held in historic Allen Fieldhouse, something it did eight times.

Teams

Bracket
* – Denotes overtime period

East region

Midwest region

Mideast region

West region

Final Four

Q = automatic qualifier bid
L = at-large bid (including 5 automatic bids seeded with at-large teams)

Game summaries

Final Four

Championship

Announcers
 Dick Enberg, Billy Packer, and Al McGuire – Final Four at St. Louis, Missouri
 Dick Enberg and Al McGuire – First round at Tulsa, Oklahoma (Louisville–St. John's, Notre Dame–Houston); Midwest Regional Final at Lawrence, Kansas; West Regional Final at Albuquerque, New Mexico
 Curt Gowdy and Billy Packer – East Regional Final at Providence, Rhode Island; Mideast Regional Final at Dayton, Ohio
 Jay Randolph and Gary Thompson – Midwest Regional semifinals at Lawrence, Kansas
 Connie Alexander and Bill Strannigan – West Regional semifinals at Albuquerque, New Mexico
 Dick Enberg and Billy Packer – First round at Knoxville, Tennessee (Kentucky–Florida State, Syracuse–Western Kentucky)
 Curt Gowdy and Al McGuire – First round at Eugene, Oregon (Arkansas–Weber State, UCLA–Kansas)
 Marv Albert and Bucky Waters – First round at Philadelphia, Pennsylvania (Villanova–La Salle, St. Bonaventure–Pennsylvania)
 Merle Harmon and Fred Taylor – First round at Indianapolis, Indiana (Marquette–Miami Ohio, Michigan State–Providence)

See also
 1978 NCAA Division II basketball tournament
 1978 NCAA Division III basketball tournament
 1978 National Invitation Tournament
 1978 NAIA Division I men's basketball tournament
 1978 National Women's Invitation Tournament

References

NCAA Division I men's basketball tournament
Ncaa
NCAA Division I men's basketball tournament
NCAA Division I men's basketball tournament